Postumia may refer to:

 Postumia gens, an ancient Roman family
 Postojna, Slovenia - Postumia in Italian
 Via Postumia, Roman road